Spare Change is a crime novel by Robert B. Parker, the sixth and final novel in his Sunny Randall series published before his death.

Plot summary
The novel begins with the notorious Spare Change serial killer resurfacing after 20 years. Sunny's father, Phil Randall, worked this case years ago, and enlists Sunny's help investigating the new string of murders. The killer's MO is to shoot the person in the head, and leave three coins at the scene of the crime, hence the name Spare Change. Spare Change sent numerous letters to Phil during the original crime spree, but then the killings abruptly stopped, until now. The reemergence of the killer after such a long time causes the Randall's to suspect a copy-cat killer.

After the first killing, Phil Randall decides to detain everyone at the scene of the next killing. They take down all of their information, and later bring them to the station and question them one by one; their hope being that the killer would have hung around the crime scene to watch. The interviews are tedious, but when Bob Johnson walks into the room he immediately becomes a suspect. Everything cries out that he is the killer, from the way he speaks, to the way he calls Sunny's father Phil, just like in the killer's correspondence. It doesn't take long before Sunny is convinced he is the killer.

Sunny begins seeing Bob Johnson in hopes of discovering some sort of evidence to allow them to arrest him. Meanwhile, the investigation continues. From a photo of his she tracks down his old college girlfriend. She informs Sunny that she dated Bob in college, had sex with him once, he was bad at it, and then she broke up with him and married someone else. While investigating at Bob's alma mater, she also discovers that his father was a professor there and had a fatal heart attack in his office. However, despite the official cause of death, the former secretary insists she saw blood when she discovered the body. Sunny follows up by interviewing the police officer at the scene who reluctantly confirms that it was in fact a suicide. The college president had insisted on reporting it as a heart attack to prevent a scandal the school couldn't afford.

Later Sunny breaks into Bob's apartment and while searching his address book, finds the name Chico Zarilla. This name leads them to an apartment and the first thing they see in the apartment is a life-size picture of Robert Johnson Sr. and a young Bob Johnson. They also find a .38 revolver and bullets that match the killer's gun. Sunny insists on having one final meeting with Bob so she can confront him with what they know and try to get a confession out of him. She fears he will just play with them after he is arrested and they will never get any answers. The police agree to this and she arranges the meeting at Spike's restaurant. The restaurant is packed with undercover police when she confronts him with what she knows. She asks him about his father, but he refuses to speak about it. He then draws his gun, puts it to Sunny's head, and begins calling for Phil.

After finding pictures of herself in Bob's scrap books and feeling the sexual tension between them, Sunny thought Bob was obsessed with her, but it turns out he was obsessed with her father all along. During the stand-off, Bob is so intent on Phil that he doesn't notice Sunny draw her weapon. She shoots him in the wrist and pulls away. The other police officers then shoot and kill him. The next day Sunny receives a package from Bob containing a videotape. The video is of Bob explaining everything. He explains that when he was fourteen he walked in on his father dressed as a Mexican gunfighter. Robert Sr. then confides in his son that most of the time he is Professor Robert Johnson, but that sometimes he is Chico Zarilla, and Chico is a killer. He confesses to his son that Chico is the Spare Change killer. Later when his mother discovers this, his father commits suicide. When Bob reaches the age that his father was when he died he decides to take up his mantle. His parents are dead; the only woman he ever loved is with another man, so he feels that Chico Zarilla is all he has left. And like before, Chico wants to kill.

Subplots
A subplot involves Sunny's friend Julie. Julie is an unscrupulous counselor who begins an affair with one of her patient's husband. Sunny agrees to a double date with his friend Jimmy. Julie and the men become intoxicated during the date and the men suggest group sex. The women of course refuse and the men insist, and just when it looks like they may be raped Sunny knees Julie's boyfriend in the crotch and draws her weapon. She then tells them to get out. Later she pays a visit to the boyfriend with Spike and threatens to have Spike beat him to a pulp if he ever bothers Julie again. Despite this the other man, Jimmy, posts nude photos of Julie on the Internet. Julie asks for Sunny's help, but she refuses, advising instead that she get a lawyer, and more importantly, psychiatric help. Another subplot involves Sunny's sister's engagement to a snobby, know-it-all college professor.

In this novel, Sunny's ex, Richie, leaves his wife. This happens after Richie refuses to remove a photo of Sunny from his office. He confesses that he still loves Sunny and they begin seeing each other again. She realizes that she doesn't want to remarry, or live with Richie, but she does love and want to be with him. She realizes she was never over him, which is why it didn't work out with Jesse Stone.

References

External links
Spare Change - Page on the book on Parker's official website

Novels by Robert B. Parker
2007 American novels
Berkley Books books
American detective novels